Auel is a municipality in the district of Rhein-Lahn, in Rhineland-Palatinate, in western Germany.

History 
In 1250 Auel was first documented as Owele. In 1437 Auel tax especially for wine was sold from the Counts of Helfenstein to the Counts of Katzenelnbogen for 60 guilder.

Notes and references

Municipalities in Rhineland-Palatinate
Rhein-Lahn-Kreis